Arvind Singh Mewar (born 13 December 1944) is an Indian businessman, former royal and chairman of HRH Group of Hotels.

Arvind and his brother Mahendra both claim to be the 76th custodian of the House of Mewar. The Maharanas of Udaipur are custodians of the kingdom on behalf of Sri Eklingji (Lord Shiva).

He is the second son of Bhagwat Singh Mewar and younger brother of Mahendra.

Education 
Arvind Singh Mewar of Udaipur was educated at Mayo College, Ajmer from where he completed his school certificate. He obtained his Bachelor's of Arts degree in Udaipur. He studied English literature, economics and political science at the Maharana Bhupal College in Udaipur.

He undertook a hotel management course from The Metropolitan College, St Albans, in the UK. Later, he worked in hospitality services in the United States.

Career 
Arvind Singh Mewar is the Chairman and Managing Director of the HRH Group of Hotels, which was started by his father in 1963. He has a crystal collection in the palace as well as a fleet of antique cars. These are open to the public.

A graduate of Mayo College, Ajmer he took a hotel management course in the UK and then went to Chicago, U.S. From 1979 to 1981, Arvind Singh Mewar lived and worked in Chicago. Back in Udaipur, from 1981 to 1984, he worked as the ADC / Personal Secretary to his father, His late Highness Maharana Bhagwat Singh Mewar. His duties included handling appointments, guest relations and travel plans. In 1982–83, he was General Manager of Lake Palace Hotel, Udaipur.

Personal life 
Mewar is married to  Vijayaraj of Kutch, Gujarat, and they have three children:  Bhargavi Kumari Mewar (m.   Nagaraju Jinka of Kotri), Padmaja Kumari Mewar (m. Kush Singh Parmar of Santrampur) and  Lakshyaraj Singh Mewar (m. Princess Nivritti of Balangir, Odisha).

There has been some controversy between branches of the family about the leadership of the House of Mewar and the subsequently the holder of the custodianship. The lines are between Arvind Singh on the one hand and Mahendra Singh on the other. In 2020, a court ruled that the estate shall be divided into 4 equal shares and allocated to Arvind, Mahendra, Yogeshwari and the deceased Maharana.

See also
Maharana Mewar Public School
Mewar
Udaipur State

References

External links 
House of Mewar
HRH Hotels
Official Website Shreeji Arvind Singh Mewar
 Haritaj Singh Mewar
Arvind Singh Mewar – The 76th custodian of the House of Mewar

1944 births
Living people
People from Udaipur
Indian royalty
Businesspeople from Rajasthan
Mewar dynasty